Bang Bang is a Brazilian telenovela produced and broadcast by TV Globo. It premiered on 3 October 2005, replacing A Lua Me Disse, and ended on 22 April 2006, replaced by Cobras & Lagartos. The telenovela is created by Mário Prata, who wrote the first thirty-four episodes before leaving due to health problems, and was replaced by Carlos Lombardi. The plot was considered a failure by the press due to the low quality of the story and poor reception.

The telenovela stars Bruno Garcia, Fernanda Lima, Mauro Mendonça, Joana Fomm, Giulia Gam, Ney Latorraca, Marisa Orth, and Carol Castro.

Cast 
 Bruno Garcia as Benjamin "Ben" Silver
 Fernanda Lima as Diana Bullock
 Carol Castro as Mercedita Bolívar
 Alinne Moraes as Penny McGold Lane
 Guilherme Berenguer as Neon Bullock
 Mauro Mendonça as Paul Jonathan Bullock
 Giulia Gam as Molly Flanders "Vegas Locomotiv"
 Guilherme Fontes as Jeff Wall Street 
 Fernanda de Freitas as Catty McGold Evans
 Joana Fomm as Miriam Viridiana McGold
 Marisa Orth as Ursula McGold Lane
 Ney Latorraca as Aquarius Lane
 Marco Ricca as Xerife Edgard Stuart / Patrik Gogol 
 Daniele Suzuki as Yoko Bell
 Ricardo Tozzi as Dr. Harold Phinter "Lobo"
 Babi Xavier as Marilyn Corroy
 Rodrigo Lombardi as Constantino Zoltar
 Kadu Moliterno as Jesse James / Denaide Johnson
 Evandro Mesquita as Billy the Kid / Henaide Johnson
 Angelina Muniz as Violeta Bolívar
 Genézio de Barros as Javier Bolívar
 Cris Bonna as Dorothy McGold Evans
 Jairo Mattos as Donald Evans "Dong Dong"
 Sidney Magal as Clayton Lake / Zorro
 Nair Bello as Leona Lake "Dona Zorra"
 Eliezer Motta as Tonto Comanche
 Thalma de Freitas as Regina da Silva "Baiana"
 Paulo Miklos as Kid Cadillac
 Roney Facchini as Nicola Felinni
 Humberto Carrão as Pablito Bolívar
 Mauren Mcgee as Thabata Corroy 
 Raphael Rodrigues as Frederic Smith "Fred Bike-Boy"
 Ariela Massoti as Brenda Lee Flanders 
 Anderson Lau as Sheng Leng Junior
 Renato Borghi as Dom Ernest
 Felipe Cardoso as Don
 Cosme dos Santos as Rush
 Renato Consorte as Father Jeremy Hacker
 Maria Helena Velasco as Bizerra
 Rui Rezende as Jack Label
 Tatiana Monteiro as Elga Andersen
 Roumer Calhães as Absurd Boy

References

External links 
 

2005 telenovelas
TV Globo telenovelas
Brazilian telenovelas
2005 Brazilian television series debuts
2006 Brazilian television series endings
2000s Brazilian television series
Portuguese-language telenovelas
2000s Western (genre) television series